Vincent Barabba (born September 6, 1934) is an American market researcher, author, former head of the United States Census Bureau, and the chairman and co-founder of Market Insight Corporation. He is known for his work in the field of market research and opinion polling.

Biography
Born in Chicago, Illinois, Barabba was awarded a bachelor's degree in marketing in 1962 from California State University, Northridge and, in 1964, an MBA in marketing from the University of California, Los Angeles. He was also awarded an Honorary Doctor of Laws in 2012 by California State University, Northridge.

Beginning as political campaign survey researcher in the 1964 California Republican primary between Nelson Rockefeller and Barry Goldwater, Barabba moved on to become a business market researcher (eventually Director of Market Intelligence) for Xerox Corp. and Eastman Kodak. He co-founded and was chairman of Market Insight Corporation, Until 2003 he was General Manager of Corporate Strategy and Knowledge Development at General Motors, where he conceived and devised OnStar and MyProductAdvisor.

He is a Past President of the American Statistical Association, and served twice as head of the US Census Bureau (the only to be appointed by a President of a different political party) and currently serves as a Commissioner of the California Citizens Redistricting Commission. He is chairman of The State of The USA, a nonprofit corporation providing quality information to the American public on societal, economic, and environmental conditions.

Awards 
In recognition of his private and public sector performance, Barabba was awarded:
Fellow of the American Statistical Association, 1976
 Lifetime Member of the American Statistical Association, 2013
 Induction into the Market Research Council's Hall of Fame 
 The American Marketing Association’s Parlin Award for leadership (1996) in the application of science to marketing research   
 The MIT/General Motors Buck Weaver Award for individuals who have contributed significantly to the advancement of theory and practice in marketing science 
 The System Dynamics Society’s Applications Award for the best “real world” application of system dynamics 
 The American Marketing Association’s Explor Award granted to organizations that have demonstrated the most innovative uses of technology in applications that advance research
 The Certificate of Distinguished Service for Contribution to the Federal Statistical System from the US Office of Management and Budget

Publications
Barabba has authored or co-authored numerous books and articles, including:
 1968 “Political Campaign Management: Myth and Reality” The Ethics of Controversy: Politics and Protest. Proceedings of the First Annual Symposium on Issues in Public Communication, held at the University of Kansas June 27–28 
 1983 (With Mason, R.O. and Mitroff, I.I.) “Federal Statistics in a Complex Environment: The Case of the 1980 Federal Census,” The American Statistician, Volume 37, No. 3, Washington, DC: The American Statistical Association
 1985 “Steel Axes for Stone Age Men” in: Buzzell, R., Marketing in an Electronic Age, 75th Anniversary Harvard Business School Research Colloquium, Boston: Harvard Business School Press 
 1991 (With Zaltman, G.) Hearing the Voice of the Market: Competitive Advantage through Creative Use of Market Information, Boston: Harvard Business School Press
 1994 “Never Say the Model Says. The Role of Models in Managerial Decision Making” in Wallace, W. Ethics in Modeling, New York: Pergamon Press
 1998 “Revisiting Plato’s Cave: Business Design in an Age of Uncertainty,” in Tapscott, D. et al., eds., Blue Print for the Digital Economy, New York: McGraw-Hill 
 2002 (With Huber, C., Cooke, F., Pudar, N., Smith, J., and Paich, M.) “A Multi-Method Approach for Creating New Business Models: The General Motors OnStar Project”, Interfaces, 32 (1), pp. 20–34
 2002 (With Pourdehnad J. and Ackoff, R.) “Above and Beyond Knowledge Management” in Chun, W. C. and Bontis, N. (eds) The Strategic Management of Intellectual Capital and Organization Knowledge, Oxford: Oxford University Press, pp. 359–369
 2004, Surviving Transformation, New York: Oxford University Press. pp. 170–171
 2011, The Decision Loom: a design for interactive decision-making in organizations

References 

1934 births
California State University, Northridge alumni
University of California, Los Angeles alumni
Living people
Market researchers
People from Chicago
Fellows of the American Statistical Association
Mathematicians from Illinois
Nixon administration personnel
Ford administration personnel
Carter administration personnel